The People's Khural (Parliament) of the Republic of Kalmykia is the regional parliament of Kalmykia, a federal subject of Russia. It consists of 27 deputies elected for five-year terms.

History
The People's Khural was established in accordance with the Constitution of the Russian Federation of 1993. But the assembly was also formed along Mongolian traditions of the State Great Khural. The legislative period normally lasts five years.

On 18 October 1994, the first People's Khural was elected. New legislatures were elected in 1999, 2005 and 2008. The fourth legislature, which was constituted in 2008, consisted of 27 deputies: 17 deputies from United Russia, seven from the Communist Party and three from the Agrarian Party of Russia. The legislature ended in 2013, when new regional parliamentary elections were held. The current chairman of the People's Khural is Anatoly Kozachko from United Russia.

Elections

2018

See also
 List of chairpersons of the People's Khural of Kalmykia

Notes

References

External links
 http://huralrk.ru Official website of the People's Khural of Kalmykia (in Russian)

Kalmykia
Politics of Kalmykia
Kalmykia